The following article presents a summary of the 1974 football (soccer) season in Brazil, which was the 73rd season of competitive football in the country.

Campeonato Brasileiro Série A

Final Stage

Final

Vasco da Gama declared as the Campeonato Brasileiro champions.

State championship champions

Youth competition champions

Brazilian clubs in international competitions

Brazil national team
The following table lists all the games played by the Brazil national football team in official competitions and friendly matches during 1974.

References

 Brazilian competitions at RSSSF
 1974 Brazil national team matches at RSSSF

 
Seasons in Brazilian football
Brazil